Lizzie Allen Harker (née Watson; 1863 – 14 April 1933) was an English author.

Amongst her works are the play Marigold (with Francis R. Pryor), which was turned into a 1938 film Marigold.

She was born in Gloucester and educated at Cheltenham Ladies College. She was the wife (married 1885), and later widow, of James Allen Harker (1847–1894), professor at the Royal Agricultural College, Cirencester. Their sons were Oswald Allen Harker (1886–1968) and Brig. Arthur William Allen Harker CBE (1890–1960), and possibly more.

Works 

 A Romance of the Nursery 1902
 Concerning Paul and Fiammetta 1906
 His First Leave
 Miss Esperance and Mr Wycherly 1908
 Master and Maid
 The Ffolliots of Redmarley
 Mr Wycherly's Wards
 Jan and her Job
 Children of the Dear Cotswolds
 Allegra, 1919
 The Bridge Across, 1921
 Her Proper Pride (with F.R. Pryor)
 The Really Romantic Age, 1922
 The Vagaries of Tod and Peter, 1923
 The Broken Bow, 1924
 Hilda Ware, 1926
 Marigold, with F.R. Pryor 1927
 Black Jack House, 1929

References

External links 
 
 
 
 Plays by Lizzie Allen Harker and F.R. Pryor on Great War Theatre

1863 births
1933 deaths
20th-century English women writers
20th-century English writers